Pagani may refer to:

 Pagani (surname), including a list of people with the name
 Pagani, Campania, town and comune in Campania, Italy
 Pagani (company), Italian car manufacturer
 Pagani Detention Center, detention center in the island of Lesbos, Greece
 Plural of Latin paganus, meaning pagan